The Girl Who Could Move Shit with Her Mind (stylized as The Girl Who Could Move Sh*t with Her Mind) is a 2019 science fiction novel by South African author Rob Boffard, under the pseudonym "Jackson Ford". It was first published by Orbit Books.

Synopsis
Teagan Frost is a telekinetic working for the United States government. When a body is found, killed in a way that seemingly only Teagan could be responsible for, she must find the real culprit, or face a life as an experimental subject.

Reception

Kirkus Reviews praised it as "fast-paced" and  "high-adrenaline", with Teagan being "frank and funny". Publishers Weekly similarly lauded the "taut action sequences and suspenseful pacing", but faulted the characters as "flimsy" and "frustratingly limited", and noted that the "romantic subplots are underwhelming".

Adaptation
In 2020, Deadline Hollywood announced that Alex Kurtzman was preparing a TV adaptation of the novel.

References

2019 science fiction novels
Novels about telekinesis
Orbit Books books